Indian Camp Run is a  long 1st order tributary to Brokenstraw Creek.  It is classed as a cold water fishery by the Pennsylvania Fish and Boat Commission.

Course
Indian Camp Run rises in Warren County, Pennsylvania about 3 miles southeast of Matthews Run, Pennsylvania and flows south to meet Brokenstraw Creek at Youngsville.

Watershed
Indian Camp Run drains  of the Pennsylvania High Plateau province and is underlaid by the Venango Formation and the Corry Sandstone through Riceville Formation. The watershed receives an average of 44.5 in/year of precipitation and has a wetness index of 335.39.  The watershed is about 78% forested.

See also 
 List of rivers of Pennsylvania

References

Rivers of Pennsylvania
Tributaries of the Allegheny River
Rivers of Warren County, Pennsylvania